Kino is a British neo-progressive rock band made up of members from other progressive rock acts (John Mitchell from Arena and The Urbane; Pete Trewavas from Marillion,  Edison's Children and Transatlantic; John Beck from It Bites; Bob Dalton also from It Bites; Chris Maitland formerly of Porcupine Tree).

The band released their debut album Picture in February 2005. 

The band was inactive from 2006-2018 with Mitchell having joined Beck and Dalton in the re-formed It Bites, replacing original singer/guitarist Francis Dunnery, touring in 2006 and releasing 2 albums., and the band no longer appearing on InsideOut music's website.

However, in January 2018, it was announced that Mitchell, Trewavas and Beck had reformed the band with Craig Blundell replacing Chris Maitland on drums. A new studio album 'Radio Voltaire' was released in March 2018.

Line up

Current members 
John Mitchell - lead and backing vocals, guitars (2004–2006, 2017–present)
Pete Trewavas - bass, bass pedals, backing and occasional lead vocals (2004–2006, 2017–present)
John Beck - synthesizers, backing and occasional lead vocals (2004–2006, 2017–present)
Craig Blundell - drums and percussion (2017–present)

Former members 
Chris Maitland (Picture Studio Recording) - drums and percussion, backing vocals (2005)
Bob Dalton - drums and percussion, backing vocals (2006)

Discography
 Picture (studio album, February 2005)
 Cutting Room Floor (compilation, December 2005)
 Radio Voltaire (studio album, March 2018)

References

External links
Kino Myspace Site
It Bites Website
Inside Out Music Website

English progressive rock groups
English rock music groups
British supergroups
Rock music supergroups
Musical groups established in 2004
Inside Out Music artists